Florian Egerer (born 17 February 1998) is a German professional footballer who plays as a midfielder for VfB Lübeck.

Career
Egerer made his professional debut for SV Meppen in the 3. Liga on 20 July 2019, starting before being substituted out at half-time for Janik Jesgarzewski in the home match against FSV Zwickau, which finished as a 2–0 loss. On 14 September 2019 Egerer scored for the first time against 1. FC Kaiserslautern.

References

External links
 
 
  at NDR.de

1998 births
Living people
Footballers from Berlin
German footballers
Association football midfielders
Hertha BSC II players
SV Meppen players
VfB Lübeck players
3. Liga players
Regionalliga players
SC Staaken players